Cremastra is a genus of flowering plants from the orchid family, Orchidaceae. It contains 4 currently recognized species (as of May 2014), native to China, Japan, Korea, Thailand, the Himalayas, and the Russian Far East.

See also 
 List of Orchidaceae genera

References 

  (1833) The Genera and Species of Orchidaceous Plants 172.
  2005. Handbuch der Orchideen-Namen. Dictionary of Orchid Names. Dizionario dei nomi delle orchidee. Ulmer, Stuttgart
  (2006). Epidendroideae (Part One). Genera Orchidacearum 4: 99 ff. Oxford University Press.

External links 

 
Calypsoinae genera